Cataract Engine Company No. 3 is a historic building at 116 Rock Street in Fall River, Massachusetts. It also served as the meeting hall of the Richard Borden GAR Post No. 46 of the Grand Army of the Republic.  It is now occupied by a tobacco shop.

The building is a two-story wood-frame structure, three bays wide, with a front-facing gable roof.  A single-story porch spans the front, and plain pilasters grace the building corners.  It was built in 1843 as the city's third fire station.  It is the city's only surviving frame fire station, and one of its only surviving non-residential Greek Revival structures.

The building was listed on the National Register of Historic Places in 1983.

See also
Lower Highlands Historic District
National Register of Historic Places listings in Fall River, Massachusetts

References

Fire stations completed in 1843
Buildings and structures in Fall River, Massachusetts
Fire stations on the National Register of Historic Places in Massachusetts
Grand Army of the Republic buildings and structures
National Register of Historic Places in Fall River, Massachusetts
Historic district contributing properties in Massachusetts
Defunct fire stations in Massachusetts
1843 establishments in Massachusetts